Leonardo Torres y Quevedo (28 December 1852 – 18 December 1936) was a Spanish civil engineer and mathematician of the late nineteenth and early twentieth centuries. Torres was a pioneer in the development of radio control and automated calculating machines, the inventor of a chess automaton, and the innovative designer of the three-lobed non-rigid Astra-Torres airship and the Whirlpool Aero Car located at Niagara Falls. With his Telekine, Torres-Quevedo created wireless remote-control operation. He introduced the idea of floating-point arithmetic. He was also a noted speaker of Esperanto.

Biography

Torres was born on 28 December 1852, on the Feast of the Holy Innocents, in Santa Cruz de Iguña, Cantabria, Spain. The family resided for the most part in Bilbao, where Leonardo's father worked as a railway engineer, although they also spent long periods in his mother's family home in Cantabria's mountain region. In Bilbao he studied to enter an advanced high school program, and later spent two years in Paris to complete his studies. In 1870, his father was transferred, bringing his family to Madrid. The same year, Torres began his higher studies in the Official School of the Road Engineers' Corps. He temporarily suspended his studies in 1873 to volunteer for the defense of Bilbao, which had been surrounded by Carlist troops during the Third Carlist War. Returning to Madrid, he completed his studies in 1876, graduating fourth in his class.

He began his career with the same train company for which his father had worked, but he immediately set out on a long trip through Europe to get to know the scientific and technical advances of the day firsthand, especially in the incipient area of electricity. Upon returning to Spain, he took up residence in Santander where he financed his own work and began a regimen of study and investigation that he never abandoned. The fruits of these investigations appeared in his first scientific work in 1893.

He married in 1885 and had eight children. In 1889 he moved to Madrid and became involved in that city's cultural life. From the work he carried out in these years, the Athenæum of Madrid created the Laboratory of Applied Mechanics, of which he was named director. The Laboratory dedicated itself to the manufacture of scientific instruments. That same year, he entered the Royal Academy of Exact Physical and Natural Sciences in Madrid, of which entity he was president in 1910. Among the work of the Laboratory, the cinematography of Gonzalo Brañas and the X-ray spectrograph of Cabrera and Costa are notable.

In the early 1900s, Torres learned the international language Esperanto, and was an advocate of the language throughout his life.

In 1916 King Alfonso XIII of Spain bestowed the Echegaray Medal upon him; in 1918, he declined the offer of the position of Minister of Development. In 1920, he entered the Royal Spanish Academy, in the seat that had been occupied by Benito Pérez Galdós, and became a member of the department of Mechanics of the Paris Academy of Science. In 1922 the Sorbonne named him an Honorary Doctor and, in 1927, he was named one of the twelve associated members of the Academy. From 1922 to 1926, he participated in the work of the International Committee on Intellectual Cooperation of the League of Nations.

Torres died in Madrid, in the heat of the Spanish Civil War, on 18 December 1936, ten days before his eighty-fourth birthday.

Google celebrated his 160th birthday on 28 December 2012 with a Google Doodle.

Work

Analytical machines

Torres y Quevedo demonstrated twice, in 1914 and in 1920, that all of the cogwheel mechanisms of a calculating machine like that of Babbage could be implemented using electromechanical parts.  His 1914 analytical machine used a small memory built with electromagnets; his 1920 machine, the electromechanical arithmometer, built to celebrate the 100th anniversary of the invention of the arithmometer, automatically performed arithmetic operations represented in decimal numeral system and used a typewriter to input commands and print the results.

Torres' 1913 paper, "Essays on Automatics," introduced the idea of floating point arithmetic, which historian Randell says was described "almost casually," apparently without recognizing the significance of the discovery. Torres also proposed a machine that acts intelligently like a human or replaces a human, and is equivalent to various current automated control machines. This machine makes "judgments" using sensors that capture information from the outside, parts that manipulate the outside world such as arms, power sources such as batteries and air pressure, and, most importantly, captures current and past information. It is defined as a machine that can control its reactions like a living thing according to external information and adapt to changes in the environment by changing its behavior.

Aerostatics

In 1902, Leonardo Torres y Quevedo presented to the Science Academies of Madrid and Paris the project of a new type of dirigible that would solve the serious problem of suspending the gondola by including an internal frame of flexible cables that would give the airship rigidity by way of internal pressure.

In 1905, with the help of Alfredo Kindelán, Torres directed the construction of the first Spanish dirigible in the Army Military Aerostatics Service, created in 1896 and located in Guadalajara. It was completed successfully, and the new airship, the España, made numerous test and exhibition flights. As a result, a collaboration began between Torres and the French company Astra, which managed to buy the patent with a cession of rights extended to all countries except Spain, in order to make possible the construction of the dirigible in its country. So, in 1911, the construction of dirigibles known as the Astra-Torres airships was begun. The distinctive three-lobed design was widely used during the First World War by the Entente powers for diverse tasks, principally naval protection and inspection.

To find a resolution to the slew of problems faced by airship engineers in docking dirigibles, Torres y Quevedo also drew up designs for a ‘docking station’ and made alterations to airship design. In 1910, Torres y Quevedo proposed the idea of attaching an airships nose to a mooring mast and allowing the airship to weathervane with changes of wind direction. The use of a metal column erected on the ground, the top of which the bow or stem would be directly attached to (by a cable) would allow a dirigible to be moored at any time, in the open, regardless of wind speeds. Additionally, Torres y Quevedo's design called for the improvement and accessibility of temporary landing sites, where airships were to be moored for the purpose of disembarkation of passengers. The final patent was presented in February 1911.

In 1919, Torres designed, in collaboration with the engineer Emilio Herrera Linares, a transatlantic dirigible, which was named Hispania, aiming to claim the honor of the first transatlantic flight for Spain. Owing to financial problems, the project was delayed and it was the Britons John Alcock and Arthur Brown who crossed the Atlantic non-stop from Newfoundland to Ireland in a Vickers Vimy twin-engine plane, in sixteen hours and twelve minutes.

The three-lobed dirigible continued to be manufactured after the patent expired in 1922 and today airships are still built with some ideas inherited from this non-rigid system.

Chess automaton

In early 1910, Torres began to construct a chess automaton he dubbed El Ajedrecista (The Chessplayer) that was able to automatically play a king and rook endgame against the king from any position, without any human intervention. Mechanical arms moved the pieces in the prototype, but by 1920 electromagnets under the board were employed for this task.

The device could be considered the first computer game in history. It created great excitement when it made its debut, at the University of Paris in 1914. It was first widely mentioned in Scientific American as "Torres and His Remarkable Automatic Devices" on November 6, 1915.

Cableways

Torres' experimentation in the field of cableways and cable cars began very early during his residence in the town of his birth, Molledo. There, in 1887, he constructed the first cableway to span a depression of some 40 metres. The cableway was some 200 metres across and was pulled by a pair of cows, with one log seat. This experiment was the basis for his first patent application, which he sought in the same year: an aerial cable car with multiple cables, with which it obtained a level of safety suitable for the transport of people, not only cargo. Later, he constructed the cableway of the Río León, of greater speed and already with a motor, but which continued to be used solely for the transport of materials, not of people.

In 1890 he presented his cableway in Switzerland, a country very interested in that form of transport owing to its geography and which was already starting to use cable cars for bulk transport, but Torres' project was dismissed, receiving some ironic commentary from the Swiss press. In 1907, Torres constructed the first cableway suitable for the public transportation of people, in the mount Ulía region in San Sebastián. The problem of safety was solved by means of an ingenious system of multiple support cables. The resulting design was very strong and perfectly resisted the failure of one of the support cables. The execution of the project was the responsibility of the Society of Engineering Studies and Works of Bilbao, which successfully constructed other cableways in Chamonix, Rio de Janeiro, and elsewhere.

But it is doubtless the Spanish Aerocar in Niagara Falls in Canada which has gained the greatest fame in this area of activity, although from a scientific point of view it was not the most important. The cableway of 580 meters in length is an aerial cable car that spans the whirlpool in the Niagara Gorge on the Canadian side, constructed between 1914 and 1916, a Spanish project from beginning to end: devised by a Spaniard and constructed by a Spanish company with Spanish capital (The Niagara Spanish Aerocar Co. Limited); a bronze plaque, located on a monolith at the entrance of the access station recalls this fact: Spanish aerial ferry of the Niagara. Leonardo Quevedo Torres (1852–1936). It was inaugurated in tests on 15 February 1916 and was officially inaugurated on 8 August 1916, opening to the public the following day; the cableway, with small modifications, continues to run to this day, with no accidents worthy of mention, constituting a popular tourist and cinematic attraction.

Radio control: the Telekino

Torres was a pioneer in the field of remote control. In 1903, he presented the Telekino at the Paris Academy of Science, and making an experimental demonstration. In the same year, he obtained a patent in France, Spain, Great Britain, and the United States. It was intended as a way of testing a dirigible of his own design without risking human lives.

The Telekino consisted of a robot that executed commands transmitted by electromagnetic waves. It constituted the world's second publicly demonstrated apparatus for radio control, after Nikola Tesla's patented "Teleautomaton", but unlike Tesla's “on/off” mechanisms, Torres' device was able to memorize the signals received to execute operations on its own and could carry out up to 19 different orders. In 1906, in the presence of the king and before a great crowd, Torres successfully demonstrated the invention in the port of Bilbao, guiding a boat from the shore with people on board. Later, he would try to apply the Telekino to projectiles and torpedoes but had to abandon the project for lack of financing. 

In 2007, the prestigious Institute of Electrical and Electronics Engineers (IEEE) dedicated a Milestone in Electrical Engineering and Computing to the Telekino, based on the research work developed at Technical University of Madrid by Prof. Antonio Pérez Yuste, who was the driving force behind the Milestone nomination.

Analogue calculating machines

Analogue calculating machines seek solutions to equations by translating them into physical phenomena. Numbers are represented by physical magnitudes such as may be done with certain rotational axes, potentials, electrical or electromagnetic states, and so on. A mathematical process is thereby transformed by these machines into an operative process of certain physical magnitudes which leads to a physical result corresponding with the desired mathematical solution. The mathematical problem therefore is solved by a physical model of itself. He began with a presentation in 1893 on algebraic machines at the Academy of Exact Physical and Natural Sciences of Spain. In his time, this was considered an extraordinary success for Spanish scientific production. In 1895 the machines were presented at a congress in Bordeaux. Later on, in 1900, The Academy presented the calculating machines at the Paris Academy of Sciences. These machines examined mathematical and physical analogies that underlay analogue calculation or continuous quantities, and how to establish mechanically the relationships between them, expressed in mathematical formulae. The study included complex variables and used the logarithmic scale. From a practical standpoint, it showed that mechanisms such as turning disks could be used endlessly with precision, so that changes in variables were limited in both directions.

On the practical side, Torres built a whole series of analogue calculating machines, all mechanical. These machines used certain elements known as arithmophores which consisted of a moving part and an index that made it possible to read the quantity according to the position shown thereon.
The aforesaid moving part was a graduated disk or a drum turning on an axis. The angular movements were proportional to the logarithms of the magnitudes to be represented. Using a number of such elements, Torres developed a machine that could solve algebraic equations, even one with eight terms, finding the roots, including the complex ones, with a precision down to one part in a thousand. One part of this machine, called an "endless spindle" ("fusee sans fin") and consisting of great mechanical complexity, allowed the mechanical expression of the relation , with the aim of extracting the logarithm of a sum as a sum of logarithms, the same technique which is the basis of the modern electronic Logarithmic Number System. Since an analogue machine was being used, the variable could be of any value (not only integer values). With a polynomial equation, the wheels representing the unknown rotate, and the result gives the values of the sum of the variables. When this sum coincides with the value of the second member, the wheel of the unknown shows a root.

With the intention of demonstrating them, Torres also built a machine for solving a second-order equation with complex coefficients, and an integrator. The Torres machine is now kept in the museum at the ETS de Ingenieros de Caminos, Canales y Puertos of the Technical University of Madrid (UPM).

See also
List of Spanish scientists, engineers and inventors
List of pioneers in computer science
Timeline of electrical and electronic engineering
Aerial tramway
Radio control
Unmanned aerial vehicle
Airship
Mooring mast
Analytical Engine
Analog computer 
History of computing hardware
History of artificial intelligence
Floating-point arithmetic 
Turing machine 
El Ajedrecista
Computer chess
Ball-and-disk integrator
Logarithmic number system
Robotics
History of robots

References

External links
From Analytical Engine to Electronic Digital Computer: The Contributions of Ludgate, Torres and Bush
A Short Account on Leonardo Torres’ Endless Spindle

1852 births
1936 deaths
People from the Besaya Valley
Scientists from Cantabria
Spanish engineers
Spanish inventors
Airship designers
Spanish Esperantists
Members of the Royal Spanish Academy
Members of the French Academy of Sciences
Polytechnic University of Madrid alumni
19th-century Spanish mathematicians